Dwight Oehlers (born 31 July 1988) is an Aruban international footballer who plays for Dutch club SDO Bussum, as a defender.

Career
He has played club football for Racing Club Aruba and SDO Bussum.

He made his international debut for Aruba in 2015.

References

1988 births
Living people
Aruban footballers
Aruba international footballers
SV Racing Club Aruba players
SDO Bussum players
Association football defenders
Aruban expatriate footballers
Aruban expatriates in the Netherlands
Expatriate footballers in the Netherlands